Baṭḥari (Arabic: اللغة البطحرية "Baṭḥari language") is an Afro-Asiatic language of Oman, located on the southeast coast facing the Khuriya Muriya Islands (17°40′46″N 55°22′19″E).  The language is very similar to Mehri and some members of the Bathari tribe speak Mehri instead of Bathari.

The first westerner to discover the existence of Bathari was Bertram Thomas in 1929.

Name
The name Bathari has been variously rendered: Batahari, Bautahari, Botahari, Bathara.  

The stress always falls on the last long syllable in Bathari, unless the stress unit is only composed of short syllables. In this case, the first syllable is stressed. As with other Modern South Arabian languages, Bathari nouns have two genders (masculine and feminine) and three numbers (singular, dual and plural), but the dual is reportedly obsolete. The ending -(v)t marks feminine nouns, apart from loanwords from Arabic that end in -h'.'  Also, it is not Shahri but Bathari which retains (or perhaps has retaken, from Arabic) the Arabic-like 'ain.

Some Bathari words were mentioned in Johnstone's Mehri Lexicon and Jibbali Lexicon (1981).  Stroomer affirms that it is a dialect of Mehri (p. xii), whereas Simeone-Senelle considers it a separate language. She does admit, however, that Bathari, along with Harsusi, is closely related to Mehri.

The most important steps towards a comprehensive descriptive grammar of Bathari language were made by Gasparini (2018).

Speakers 
In terms of speaker numbers they range from 12 to 20 for Bathari to over 180,000 for Mehri.

Threat of Extinction 
In addition to the threat of Arabic, Mehri also threatens to replace the Bathari language due to its less prestigious position. The tribe seems to be dying out with the language also under threat from modern education solely in Arabic. The Bathari language is nearly extinct. Estimates are that the number of remaining speakers are under 100. In 2016, Janet Watson gave an estimate of 12 to 20 (in “Language, Culture, and the Environment”). In 2019, the UAE's The National newspaper put the number of remaining elderly fluent speakers left at just 12 to 17, as well as a few dozen middle-aged speakers who mixed it with Arabic.

References

External links
 Bathari Engdangered Languages Profile (Endangered Languages Project).
 Bathari Word List (Bathari Word List of 40 Words).
 Gasparini's PhD Thesis (Laboratorio di Fonetica Sperimentale "Arturo Genre" - Università degli Studi di Torino)

Languages of Oman
Endangered Afroasiatic languages
Modern South Arabian languages